Denys Vladyslavovych Ryabyi (born 4 August 2001) is a Ukrainian professional footballer who plays as a left back for Ukrainian club Bukovyna Chernivtsi.

Personal life 
He is the twin brother of Artem Ryabyi.

References

External links
 Profile on Bukovyna Chernivtsi official website
 

2001 births
Living people
Ukrainian footballers
Association football defenders
FC Bukovyna Chernivtsi players
Ukrainian Second League players
Ukrainian twins
Twin sportspeople
Sportspeople from Chernivtsi